This is a list of television stations affiliated with Daystar, a religious television network founded by Marcus and Joni Lamb.

References

External links
Official website

Religious television
Daystar